
The following lists events that happened during 1806 in South Africa.

Events
 4 January – The British expeditionary force arrives at the Cape
 8 January – British troops land at Losperds Bay, between Bloubergstrand and Melkbosstrand in the Cape Colony.
The Battle of Blaauwberg takes place between the British and the Dutch colonists.
 10 January – Governor Jan Willem Janssens capitulates and Sir David Baird is appointed Governor of the Cape
 The first regular inland postal service is started.

References
See Years in South Africa for list of references

History of South Africa